The finals and the qualifying heats of the Men's 50 metres Freestyle event at the 1997 FINA Short Course World Championships were held on the last day of the competition, on Sunday 20 April 1997 in Gothenburg, Sweden.

Finals

Qualifying heats

References
 Results

F
World Championships